Patrick Robin Gilbert Vanden-Bempde-Johnstone, 4th Baron Derwent  (26 October 1901 – 2 January 1986), was a British peer and Conservative politician.

Derwent was the younger son of Hon. Edward Henry Vanden-Bempde-Johnstone, younger son of Harcourt Vanden-Bempde-Johnstone, 1st Baron Derwent. His mother was Evelyn Mary Agar-Ellis. He was educated at Sandroyd School then Charterhouse School. He succeeded as fourth Baron Derwent on the death of his elder brother in 1949 and was able to take a seat in the House of Lords. In September 1962, Derwent was appointed Minister of State for Trade in the Conservative government of Harold Macmillan, and when Sir Alec Douglas-Home became Prime Minister in October 1963 he was promoted to Minister of State for Home Affairs. He retained this post until the Conservative loss in the 1964 general election. He never held ministerial office again but served for many years as a Deputy Speaker in the House of Lords.

Lord Derwent married Marie-Louise Henriette Picard, daughter of Albert Picard of Paris, France, in 1929. He died in January 1986, aged 84, and was succeeded in the barony by his son Robin Evelyn Leo Vanden-Bempde-Johnstone.

References
Kidd, Charles, Williamson, David (editors). Debrett's Peerage and Baronetage (1990 edition). New York: St Martin's Press, 1990.

www.thepeerage.com

1901 births
1986 deaths
People educated at Charterhouse School
People educated at Sandroyd School
Barons in the Peerage of the United Kingdom
Commanders of the Order of the British Empire
Ministers in the Macmillan and Douglas-Home governments, 1957–1964